Comiskey is a ghost town in Morris County, Kansas, United States.

History
Comiskey was platted in 1887 and originally a whistle-stop of the Missouri Pacific Railroad.  A post office existed in Comiskey from 1887 to 1929 (about 42 years).  In 1910, the community had a population of 28.

Following the St. Louis Browns victory in the 1886 World Series over the Chicago White Stockings, the Missouri Pacific Railroad honored several of the St. Louis players by naming some of their depots after the players.  This community was named in honor of St. Louis Browns 1st baseman Charles Comiskey (later he founded Chicago White Sox and built Comiskey Park).  The neighboring city of Bushong was named after Doc Bushong from the same team.

Geography

References

Further reading

 Living in the Depot: The Two-Story Railroad Station; H. Roger Grant; University of Iowa Press; 130 pages; 1993; .  Contains historic images of Kansas stations at Alta Vista, Bucklin, Comiskey, Haddam, Hoyt, and Wakarusa.

External links

 Morris County maps: Current, Historic, KDOT

Ghost towns in Kansas